The 1993 Milan–San Remo was the 84th edition of the Milan–San Remo cycle race and was held on 20 March 1993. The race started in Milan and finished in San Remo. The race was won by Maurizio Fondriest of the Lampre team.

General classification

References

1993
March 1993 sports events in Europe
1993 in road cycling
1993 in Italian sport
1993 UCI Road World Cup